Sasana Wiratama, also known as Museum Monumen Pangeran Diponegoro (Diponegoro Monument Museum) is a museum complex in Yogyakarta, Indonesia. The complex consists of a museum and a monument which commemorates the struggle of Prince Diponegoro, an 18th-century Javanese prince and a National Hero.

History
The building where the museum stands was handed down to the government of Yogyakarta by the heir of Diponegoro, Raden Ayu Kanjangteng Diponegoro, to function as a monument after signing a transfer letter with Nyi Hadjar Dewantara and Kanjeng Raden Tumenggung Purejodiningrat. Beginning from mid-1968 until 19 August 1969, a monument was built on the pringgitan building that adjoined with the pendopo at the center of the complex. The project was initiated by Major General Surono who was the Commander of the Military District and was inaugurated by President Suharto. This place was then named Sasana Wiratama, Javanese "place for soldiers".

Collection
Pangeran Diponegoro monument is a relief on a 20 meters-long and 4 meters-high wall, telling the story of a peaceful Tegalrejo village and the war between Diponegoro and the Dutch colony until his capture in Magelang. On both sides of the monument, there were self-portrait of Pangeran Diponegoro on the west side and the painting of Pangeran Diponegoro who was riding his black horse, ready to wage war, on the east side.

Some of the artifacts which originate from Diponegoro includes the broken wall (parts of the original house of Diponegoro), a padasan (place for performing ritual Muselim ablution), and a komboran (a stone container for Diponegoro's horses to get water and food). Other inheritances from Diponegoro are kept in Magelang (a Qur'an, cup and pot, a robe, four tables, and one chair). National Museum of Indonesia at Jakarta kept a horse saddle and a lance. One kris of Diponegoro is still kept in the Netherlands.

In front of the building, situated on H.O.S Cokroaminoto Street, there is a statue of Lieutenant General Oerip Soemohardjo with the writing "Orde.Contre-Ordre.Desordre!" on the east side and a statue of General Sudirman with the writing "Jangan Lengah" (Indonesian, "Don't be inattentive") on the west side. These statues represent the place where Indonesian people struggled for their independence.

After passing through the gate, there is a two-meter high wall resembling the dome of a mosque with a picture of a giant opposing a dragon on the upper part of it. The picture is a sengkalan memet (a Javanese chronogram) which forms the Javanese sentence Butho Mekso Basuki ning Bawono, denoting the Javanese year of 1825, the onset of Diponegoro war.

There are 100 items as the collection of Diponegoro museum, consisting of some original goods of Diponegoro paramilitary troop ranging from war weapons, coins, precious stone and home furniture. Some examples of weapons are lances, kris, swords, arrows, bandil (iron hammer), patrem (a kind of weapon for women), and candrasa (a sharp weapon that looks like a chignon pin used by women spies). There are also some 18th-century household tools made from brass such as betel container and its kecohan (a container in which someone spits after chewing betel), canting (a tool used to make batik) holder, bringsing pot, and various forms of kacip (a tool to slice areca nut as an ingredient to chew betel).

There are two sacred weapons kept in this museum, namely a kris with 21 curves named Kyai Omyang, made by an empu (kris maker) who lived during Majapahit time and a sword originating from Demak Kingdom. Those two sacred weapons are believed to be able to prevent disasters.

There is also a small statue of Ganesha, the lace of the horses that pull a cart presented by Hamengkubuwono VIII, a couple of loro Blonyo (pedestal/foundation) statues and a pair of decorative lamps. There are some parts of the gamelan (Javanese music instrument) owned by Hamengkubuwono II that was made in 1752 in the forms of a percussion and wilahan bonang made of wood, copper and brass. There is also a cannon in the east of the hall.

See also
 List of museums and cultural institutions in Indonesia

References

Buildings and structures in Yogyakarta
Museums in Yogyakarta
Museums established in 1969
Monuments and memorials in Indonesia